Northwest Academy is an independent, arts-focused middle and high school (grades 6–12) in downtown Portland, Oregon, United States. The school is accredited by the Northwest Association of Independent Schools (NWAIS). Teachers include former college instructors and professional artists, directors, dancers, musicians, and writers. Students are grouped by proficiency rather than age and advance based on demonstrating what they have learned.

History
The high school was founded in 1997 by Mary Vinton Folberg and had 26 students its first year. Folberg was an English and dance teacher in California before launching the Jefferson High School dance department in Portland in 1969 and then The Jefferson Dancers in 1976. She founded Northwest Academy to develop an arts-focused high school. The middle school was opened in 2002. The total school enrollment was over 200 students for the 2015–2016 school year.

Notable alumni
Esperanza Spalding – jazz musician

See also
 Willamette Ballet Academy
 Do Jump

References

High schools in Portland, Oregon
Private high schools in Oregon
Educational institutions established in 1997
Private middle schools in Oregon
1997 establishments in Oregon